Eucalyptus wubinensis, also known as Wubin mallee, is a species of mallee that is endemic to Western Australia. It has smooth grey bark, lance-shaped adult leaves, flower buds in groups of seven and cup-shaped, barrel-shaped or cylindrical fruit.

Description
It has smooth white or greyish bark with bronze or brown streaks and is shed in long ribbons.

Taxonomy and naming
Eucalyptus wubinensis was first formally described in 2001 by Lawrie Johnson and Ken Hill from specimens collected near Wubin in 1983. The specific epithet is a reference to its occurrence in the Wubin district.

Distribution and habitat
This mallee grows in mallee shrubland on sandplains from east of Wubin to Ballidu and east to Kulja.

See also
List of Eucalyptus species

References

Eucalypts of Western Australia
wubinensis
Myrtales of Australia
Plants described in 2001
Mallees (habit)
Taxa named by Lawrence Alexander Sidney Johnson
Taxa named by Ken Hill (botanist)